Nambiār, also known as Nambiyār, is a sub-group of the Indian Nair caste. Many were jenmi landlords in the Malabar region.

In earlier days, Nambiar women, like most women of Nair clans of north Malabar, would not marry Nair men of South Malabar.

References

Indian surnames
Nair